The Kaikadi language is a Dravidian language related to Tamil, spoken by about 23,000 people of the formerly nomad Kaikadi tribe primarily in Maharashtra.

References

Tamil languages